František Hadaš (born 22 March 1941) is a Czech archer. He competed in the men's individual event at the 1980 Summer Olympics.

References

1941 births
Living people
Czech male archers
Olympic archers of Czechoslovakia
Archers at the 1980 Summer Olympics
Sportspeople from Zlín